Vigen Cliffs is a set of cliffs rising to about 5,741 ft (1,750 m) to the east of Gabbro Crest on the Saratoga Table in the Forrestal Range of the Pensacola Mountains in Antarctica.

It was named by Advisory Committee on Antarctic Names (US-ACAN) in 1979 for Oscar C. Vigen, Budget and Planning Officer, Division of Polar Programs, National Science Foundation, 1968–85.

Cliffs of Queen Elizabeth Land